Rabia Ashiq (born 15 April 1992 in Lahore) is a Pakistani track and field athlete.

Ashiq represents Water and Power Development Authority (WAPDA) in national competitions. Ashiq was awarded a wildcard for the 2012 Summer Olympics in London where she competed in the 800 metres and finished sixth in the fourth heat of round one.

Personal bests
800 metres – 2:10:65 (2012)
5000 metres – 19:04.00 (2012)

References

1992 births
Living people
Pakistani female middle-distance runners
People from Lahore
Olympic athletes of Pakistan
Athletes (track and field) at the 2012 Summer Olympics
Athletes (track and field) at the 2018 Asian Games
Asian Games competitors for Pakistan